Sayed Mohammad Ali Jawid (born c.1951) is a politician and the leader of Islamic Movement of Afghanistan. He was born in Polebaraq, Balkh province, in the Islamic calendar year 1330 (1951–1952 AD) in a poor and religious family. He completed his preliminary education in Afghanistan and moved to Najaf, Iraq for higher education, where he completed his Ph.D. in religious studies. He speaks Persian and Arabic fluently. During the communist regime, he founded the Islamic Movement of Afghanistan under the leadership of Sheikh Muhammad Asif Muhsini. During the Soviet invasion of Afghanistan, he was engaged in Jihad against the foreign powers. After the victory of Mujahideen he served in the following seats:
 Minister of Planning and management
 Minister of transport
In the current government he has served as follow:
 Minister of transportation
 Spokesman of National communication front

He is now the leader of the Islamic Movement of Afghanistan and MNA representing the people of Balkh Province. He lives in Kabul, Afghanistan.

See also 
 List of Hazara people

References

Living people
Hazara politicians
People from Mazar-i-Sharif
Islamic Movement of Afghanistan politicians
1951 births
Government ministers of Afghanistan
Transport ministers of Afghanistan
Senior Advisors to the President of Afghanistan